USS Ranger was a sloop-of-war in the Continental Navy in active service in 1777–1780, the first to bear her name.  Built at Portsmouth Naval Shipyard on Badger's Island in Kittery, Maine, she is famed for the one-ship raiding campaign by Captain John Paul Jones, during naval operations of the American Revolutionary War.  In six months spent primarily in British waters she captured five prizes (mostly merchantmen), staged a single failed attack on the English mainland at Whitehaven, and caused Royal Navy ships to be dispatched against her in the Irish Sea.

Under Simpson Ranger went on to capture twenty-four more prizes abroad the Atlantic and along the U.S. coast during 1778 and 1779.

Sent to the South in late 1779 to aid the U.S. garrison at Charleston, South Carolina, during the British siege, she continued her raiding career until ultimately forced to take station on the Cooper River, and was captured on May 11, 1780, with the fall of the city.

She was brought into the Royal Navy as HMS Halifax.  Decommissioned in 1781 in Portsmouth, England, she was sold that year as a merchant ship.

History
Ranger (initially called Hampshire) was launched on May 10, 1777 by James Hackett, master shipbuilder, at the shipyard of John Langdon on what is now called Badger's Island in Kittery, Maine; Captain John Paul Jones in command.

Continental Navy
After fitting out, she sailed for France on November 1, 1777, carrying dispatches telling of General Burgoyne's surrender to the commissioners in Paris. On the voyage over, two British prizes were captured. Ranger arrived at Nantes, France, on December 2, where Jones sold the prizes and delivered the news of the victory at Saratoga to Benjamin Franklin. On February 14, 1778, Ranger received a nine-gun salute to the new American flag, the "Stars and Stripes" from the ship of the line Robuste, under Lamotte-Picquet, at Quiberon Bay. This was the first salute from a warship and, the second to an American fighting vessel by a foreign power (the first salute was received by  when on November 16, 1776 she arrived at St. Eustatius and the Dutch island returned her 11-gun salute).

Ranger sailed from Brest April 10, 1778, for the Irish Sea and four days later captured brigantine "Dolphin" between the Scilly Isles and Cape Clear and scuttled it. On 16 April, she took ship "Lord Chatham" 5 leagues from Cape Clear and sent her to Brest, France. On the 19th sunk a Scottish coastal schooner in the Mull of Galloway. On the 20th sunk a sloop. Captain Jones led a raid on the English port of Whitehaven, April 23, spiking the guns of the fortress, but failing in his attempt to burn the ships in the harbor. Sailing across the bay to St. Mary's Isle, Scotland, the American captain planned to seize the Earl of Selkirk and hold him as a hostage and use him to make several political demands. However, since the Earl was absent, the plan failed. Several Royal Navy vessels were searching for Ranger, and Captain Jones sailed across the North Channel to Carrickfergus, Ireland, to induce  of 14 guns, to come out and fight. Drake came out slowly against the wind and tide, and, after an hour's battle, the battered Drake struck her colors, with eight sailors being killed in action during the engagement on the 24th. Later on the same day she captured the brigantine "Patience". Having made temporary repairs, and with a prize crew on Drake, Ranger continued around the west coast of Ireland, capturing a lone storeship, and arrived at Brest with her prizes on May 8.

Captain Jones was detached to command , leaving Lieutenant Simpson, his first officer, in command.

Seven prizes were captured early in April, and brought safely into port for sale. On 18 June, Ranger was underway again with Providence and Queen of France, capturing two Jamaicamen in July and nine more vessels off the Grand Banks of Newfoundland. Of the 11 prizes, three were recaptured, but the remaining eight, with their cargoes, were worth over a million dollars when sold in Boston.

Underway on November 23, Ranger was ordered to Commodore Whipple's squadron, arriving at Charleston on December 23, to support the garrison there under siege by the British. On January 24, 1780, Ranger and Providence, in a short cruise down the coast, captured three transports, loaded with supplies, near Tybee, Georgia. The British army tasked with capturing Charleston was also discovered in the area. Ranger and Providence sailed back to Charleston with the news. Shortly afterwards the British commenced the final push. Although the channel and harbor configuration made naval operations and support difficult, Ranger took a station in the Cooper River, and was captured when Charleston fell on 11 May 1780.

Royal Navy
Ranger was taken into the British Royal Navy and commissioned under the name HMS Halifax. She was decommissioned in Portsmouth, England, in 1781, then sold as a merchant vessel for about 3 percent of her original cost.

Specifications
Rangers specifications were:

Begun: January 11, 1777 
Launched: May 10, 1777, into the Piscataqua River 
Location: Rising Castle, now Badger's Island, Kittery, Maine 
Departed: November 1, 1777 
Builder: John Langdon 
Designer: James Hackett 
Yard Boss: Tobias Lear IV (father of Tobias Lear V, Secretary to President George Washington) 
Officers:
John Paul Jones, Captain 
Thomas Simpson, Portsmouth, 1st Lt
Elijah Hall, Portsmouth, 2nd Lt
Samuel Wallingford, Lt of Marines 
Dr Ezrah Green, Dover, Surgeon 
Mr Joseph Frazer, Sr Officer of Marines 
Capt Matthew Parke 
Crew: 145 men including nearly half from Piscataqua area 
Cost: $65,000 Continental dollars 
Rating: Sloop of war 
Rigging: Square rigged on all three masts with royals, topgallant, and a full set of studding sails 
Arms: 18 nine-pounder guns 
Painting: Topside black with broad yellow stripe and masthead 
Dimensions: (Recorded by Royal Navy after capture) 
97' 2" at gundeck (est. 110' overall) 
77' 9" keel 
27' 8" beam 
12' depth of hold

References

External links

 .

 John Paul Jones and the Ranger by J. Dennis Robinson

1777 ships
Ships built in Kittery, Maine
Ships of the Continental Navy
Ships of the Royal Navy